The Cossulinae are a subfamily of the family Cossidae (carpenter or goat moths).

Genera
 Austrocossus Gentili, 1986
 Biocellata Davis, Gentili-Poole & Mitter, 2008
 Cossula Bailey, 1882
 Magulacra Davis, Gentili-Poole & Mitter, 2008
 Simplicivalva Davis, Gentili-Poole & Mitter, 2008
 Spinulata Davis, Gentili-Poole & Mitter, 2008

Former genera
 Catopta Staudinger, 1899
 Lamellocossus Daniel, 1956
 Parahypopta Daniel, 1961

References

Natural History Museum Lepidoptera generic names catalog

 
Cossidae
Moth subfamilies